Lia Halloran (born 1977) is an American painter and photographer who lives and works in Los Angeles.

Life and education
Born in Chicago, IL., Lia Halloran grew up in the San Francisco Bay Area town of Pacifica, CA. Her youth was spent skateboarding and surfing, first given a skateboard at the age of five, and at the age of 15 was featured in Thrasher magazine. She developed an early love for science during high school at her first job, where she performed cow eye dissections and laser demonstrations at the Exploratorium in San Francisco. Her love for skateboarding, surfing, and science would later play an important role in her own understanding of art and creativity.

Halloran's formal education began at UCLA, where she received a BFA in 1999, and then Yale, where she received a MFA in Painting in Printmaking in 2001.

Halloran lives and works in Los Angeles, CA, and currently serves as Associate Professor of Art and Director of the Painting and Drawing Department at Chapman University in Orange, CA. She teaches painting, as well as courses she personally designed that explore the intersection of art and science. With an interdisciplinary approach towards her own work, an understanding of science provides a curious nature crucial to an artistic mind. One for adventure, Halloran's hobbies include flying planes.

Work 
Halloran's studio practice is in constant dialogue between art and science. Originating through scientific concepts, her works interweave ideas of the natural world with those of physicality, sexuality, intimacy and movement. Her projects blend these ideas with that of mapping the physics of motion, as seen in The World Is Bound In Secret Knots and Dark Skate, or perception, scale, and giant crystal caves, as seen in The Only Way Out Is Through, or cabinets of curiosities and taxonomy, as seen in Wonder Room, or the periodic table of elements, as seen in Sublimation/Transmutation.

Halloran has been involved in several collaborative projects, including co-curating exhibitions, one with artist Rebecca Campbell titled, Better Far Pursue A Frivolous Trade By Serious Means, Than A Sublime Art Frivolously, and another exhibition about the nature of scale with physicist  Dr. Lisa Randall, titled Measure for Measure. Additionally, she is currently working a book with physicist Kip Thorne, which will include Halloran's paintings and Kip's prose about the warped side of the universe.

Halloran's work has been featured in numerous publications, including The Los Angeles Times, The New York Times, The New Yorker, New York Magazine, The Boston Globe, and ArtNews. She has had solo exhibitions at the DCKT Contemporary (New York, NY), Martha Otero Gallery (Los Angeles, CA), Hilger NEXT (Vienna, Austria), Fredric Snitzer Gallery (Miami, FL), LaMontagne Gallery (Boston, MA) and Sandroni Rey (Los Angeles, CA). Her work has been acquired by the Solomon R. Guggenheim Museum (New York, NY), The Speyer Family Collection (New York, NY), the Art Museum of South Texas (Corpus Christi, TX), and The Progressive Art Collection (Cleveland, OH).

Dark Skate

The haunting photographic series, Dark Skate (2008–present, c-prints), comments on the nature of physical being and spiritual essence in a contemporary world. Beginning in 2007, the ongoing series has been shot in the hidden and gritty architecture of various cities, including Los Angeles, Detroit, Miami, and Vienna.

The photos illustrate an after-image of Halloran's performance, as she rides a skateboard with a light-source attached to her body. The long exposure time of the photographs, upwards of forty minutes, captures a light-drawing of motion but not the artist herself. Dark Skate can be understood as a series of self-portraits, while her physicality is not depicted, her essence illuminates the urban scenes. Like the individual photos trace a course of action, the entire series traces back Halloran's own biography: paying homage to her youth as a female skateboarder and surfer, and how it has merged with her own understanding and study of astrophysics. These experiences taught Halloran the meaning of a body in space, and how to trace her own path as she travels through the dark.

While biographical, the series speaks of humanity on a much larger scale; specifically the human experience and interaction within the modern phenomenon of a concrete jungle. As infrastructure and industrialization replace the natural environment, the human spirit seems to have lost an intimate connection to its surroundings. The actual labor and process of Dark Skate addresses this modern disconnect, and humanizes the physical experience of living in the urban world.

Deep Sky Companion 

Halloran's series, Deep Sky Companion (2013, cliché-verre prints), delves deep into the universe to explore the mystery between the known and unknown. Her collection references the scientific discoveries of deep sky objects, classified and catalogued by French astronomer, Charles Messier (1730–1817). As Messier translated his observations into reproductions, Halloran illustrates her own response to the 110 astronomical findings. While in a more simple pursuit of comets, Messier's unexpected observations were far greater, discovering whole galaxies and interstellar nebulae. In a similarly exploratory fashion, Halloran's procedure is largely a matter of chance, as the inks and prints are whim to natural and chemical processes. While entirely calculated, Halloran's works channel a similar uncertainty Messier faced. She reinterprets Messier's personal experience, enlivening a mystery and wonder that is often lost to scientific frustrations. Deep Sky Companion does not dwell in the unknown, but is energized by the fascinations of mystery. The collection of 110 circular photographic cliche-verre disks were acquired by the Caltech, and now permanently resides in the Cahill Center for Astronomy and Astrophysics. Halloran collaborated with architect, David Ross, to create the perfect physical and structural layout for the exhibition. The 110 photographic works climb upwards through three stories, of architect Thom Mayne's unique building of slanted ceilings and extreme planes, forcing viewers to mimic the physical experience of astronomers observing objects in deep space.

Your Body is a Space That Sees 

In the series, Your Body is a Space That Sees (2016-2017, cyanotype print), Halloran continues the theme of exploring scientific classification systems by re-investigating the timeline of discovery to unearth the influential women in its groundings. This large-scale series of cyanotypes is dedicated to the women of astronomy, whose fundamental and important impact on the field is often overlooked.

This group of women known as the “Harvard Computers,” classified the brightness, size, and chemical composition of stars. In partnership with the Harvard University Archive, Halloran's works references the photographic plates used by these women to catalogue their research. With the support of an Art Works Grant from the National Endowment of the Arts in partnership with Chapman University, Halloran was able to conduct extensive research on these women, in order to create astonishing images of the night sky.

The cyanotypes are created through a scientific and experimental process, by painting the images on semitransparent drafting film. Next, they are pressed on paper glazed with light-sensitive emulsion and exposed to the sun, creating a positive image. This process mimics that of the Harvard Computer's astronomical plates, essentially creating a photographic print without the use of a camera. Stepping away from the often formulaic process of science, Halloran's pieces do not dwell in accuracy, but instead offers an active experience, re-igniting the spirit of the universe.

References

American photographers
Yale University alumni
1977 births
Living people
American women painters
Painters from Illinois
21st-century American women photographers
21st-century American photographers